In image analysis, a resel (from resolution element) represents the actual spatial resolution in an image or a volumetric dataset.
The number of resels in the image may be lower or equal to the number of pixel/voxels in the image. 
In an actual image the resels can vary across the image and indeed the local resolution can be expressed as "resels per pixel" (or "resels per voxel").

In functional neuroimaging analysis, an estimate of the number of resels together with random field theory is used in statistical inference.
Keith Worsley has proposed an estimate for the number of resels/roughness.

The word "resel" is related to the words "pixel", "texel", and "voxel", and Waldo R. Tobler is probably among the first to use the word.

See also 
 Kell factor

References

Bibliography 
 Keith J. Worsley, An unbiased estimator for the roughness of a multivariate Gaussian random field, Technical report, 2000 July.
 
 

Image processing
Computer graphics